The Infection Control Society of Pakistan (ICSP) is a non-profit national organisation in Pakistan, representing specialist practitioners in infection control. The body consists of a network of health care professionals, Social scientists, financial advisors, opinion leaders and international experts and has conducted research and studies for control and prevention of infectious diseases in the country.

The body is an affiliated member of the International Federation of Infection Control (IFIC), International Society for Infectious Diseases, based in the United States and the Global Health Council based in Washington D.C.. It is headed by its president Rafiq Khanani.

References

Infectious disease organizations
Medical and health organisations based in Pakistan